Prince Louis Football Club is a football club from Bujumbura, Burundi. It is named in honour of the independence hero Prince Louis Rwagasore.

Honours
 Burundi Premier League: 2
 1976, 2001

 Burundian Cup: 1
 1992

Performance in CAF competitions
 CAF Champions League: 1 appearance
2002 – Preliminary Round
 CAF Confederation Cup: 1 appearance
2007 – Preliminary Round
 CAF Cup Winners' Cup: 1 appearance
1993 – Second Round

References

Football clubs in Burundi
Bujumbura